Nizhny Sardyk (Tübänge Särźek) is a rural locality (a village) in Tatar-Ulkanovsky Selsoviet, Tuymazinsky District, Bashkortostan, Russia. The population was 209 as of 2010. There are 2 streets.

Geography 
Nizhny Sardyk is located 23 km east of Tuymazy (the district's administrative centre) by road. Verkhny Sardyk is the nearest rural locality.

References 

Rural localities in Tuymazinsky District